Pinko Pallino is a 2-player abstract strategy game designed by Mirko Marchesi and published by Epta Games in 1995.

Game design 
A dark wooden plaque is divided into 11 x 11 squares by grooved lines. In total there is 2 pawns and 42 walls. Each player has a steel pawn and 21 steel walls. Pinko Pallino is designed exclusively for 2 players.

Gameplay and Rules 
The pawns are placed on the middle square at opposing sides of the board. Each players goal is to move their own pawn across the board to reach the last row on the opposite side. On each turn a player can either move his pawn one square, or put a wall. When a player runs out of his own walls, they can only move their pawn.

Placed walls can not be removed. The only limit to placing them is that you can never totally close either of the pawns: you have to leave a way, no matter how long, to reach its goal.

A pawn can move one square in any direction (horizontally, vertically, or diagonally), unless there is a wall in the way.

History 
The game was created by Mirko Marchesi in 1995. Pinko Pallino is inspired by the previous game called Blockade by Philip Slater in 1975. 

2 years later, the game was licensed to Gigamic for an international edition under the title of Quoridor. Quoridor has a smaller board (9x9), 4 wooden pawns (for 2 or 4 players), 20 wooden fences total (10 each in a 2-player game, or 5 each in a 4-player game) and the abolition of diagonal movement. This decision reduced the cost of the game's production and increased its playability.

Notation 
There isn't a notation provided by the creator of the game. However, the notation of Quoridor can be adapted, which is similar to algebraic chess notation.

 Each square gets a unique letter-number designation. From player 1's perspective columns are labeled a through k (left to right) and rows are numbered 1 through 11 (bottom to top).  
 Pawns start at the squares f1 and f11. Each pawn move is defined by the new square occupied by the pawn. For example, if player 1 moves 1 square upwards, namely from f1 to f2, player 1’s move is denoted as f2. 
 Each wall move is defined by the square closest to a1. For example: a vertical wall between columns e and f and spanning rows 3 and 4 would be given the designation e3v.

Awards and honors

See also 

 Blockade (board game), predecessor of this game
Quoridor, a similar board game with smaller board

References 

Board games introduced in 1995
Abstract strategy games